Notagonum lackneri is a species of ground beetle in the subfamily Platyninae. It was described by Baehr in 2010.

It is named after the collector, Tomas Lackner. The species is found in Central Papua, Indonesia.

References

Notagonum
Beetles described in 2010